Dănuț Pop (born 24 November 1968) is a Romanian judoka. He competed in the men's half-lightweight event at the 1992 Summer Olympics.

References

External links
 

1968 births
Living people
Romanian male judoka
Olympic judoka of Romania
Judoka at the 1992 Summer Olympics
Sportspeople from Cluj-Napoca